Aquinas High School can refer to:

In Kenya 
Aquinas High School (Nairobi, Kenya)

In the United States 
Aquinas High School (California), San Bernardino, California
Aquinas High School (Georgia), Augusta, Georgia
Aquinas High School (Iowa) (merged in 2005), Fort Madison, Iowa
Aquinas High School (Michigan), Southgate, Michigan
Aquinas High School (Nebraska), David City, Nebraska
Aquinas High School (New York), Bronx, New York City, New York
Aquinas High School (Wisconsin), La Crosse, Wisconsin

See also
 St. Thomas Aquinas High School (disambiguation)
 St. Thomas Aquinas Secondary School (disambiguation)
Aquinas Institute, Rochester, New York